Pitkyarantsky (masculine), Pitkyarantskaya (feminine), or Pitkyarantskoye (neuter) may refer to:
Pitkyarantsky District, a district of the Republic of Karelia, Russia
Pitkyarantskoye Urban Settlement, a municipal formation which the town of Pitkyaranta and three rural localities in Pitkyarantsky District of the Republic of Karelia, Russia are incorporated as